Paradystus notator is a species of beetle in the family Cerambycidae. It was described by Francis Polkinghorne Pascoe in 1867. It is known from Borneo, Java, Singapore, Malaysia, and Sumatra.

Varietas
 Paradystus notator var. sericeoprolongatus Breuning, 1954
 Paradystus notator var. fuscoampliatus Breuning, 1954

References

Saperdini
Beetles described in 1867